The First Presbyterian Church of Tonkawa is a historic church in Tonkawa, Oklahoma. It was built in 1905.  It was added to the National Register of Historic Places in 1994.

It is a side-steeple church.

References

Presbyterian churches in Oklahoma
Churches on the National Register of Historic Places in Oklahoma
Churches completed in 1905
Buildings and structures in Kay County, Oklahoma
National Register of Historic Places in Kay County, Oklahoma
1905 establishments in Oklahoma Territory